Naiduvalasa is a village in Vizianagaram district, Andhra Pradesh, India.

References

Villages in Vizianagaram district